State Route 844 (SR 844) is a  state highway in central Nevada, United States.  The route follows Ione Road, covering part of the connection between State Route 361 and Berlin-Ichthyosaur State Park.  SR 844 was formerly known as State Route 91, which extended further northeast to Ione.

Route description

The route heads east from there, passing through a small section of the Humboldt-Toiyabe National Forest. The road continues past the SR 844 terminus to connect to Berlin-Ichthyosaur State Park near the town site of Berlin and also provides connections to the town of Ione.

History

The routing of SR 844 first appears on state maps in 1960 as State Route 91.  This route was a graded road from State Route 23 (now SR 361) north of Gabbs east  to near Iron Stakes Mine.  From there, the route extended east another  along an unpaved road towards the Ichthyosaur State Park area before turning north and traveling another  to Ione.  By 1968, the entire highway from the west terminus to the state park turn-off had been graded; this section was paved by 1973.

The route was changed in the 1976 renumbering of Nevada's state highway system.  SR 91 was renumbered as State Route 844 on July 1, 1976.  The new number was first shown on the 1978–79 edition of the state highway map.

Major intersections

See also

References

844
Transportation in Nye County, Nevada